Dermot FitzGerald (20 March 1935 – 5 February 2006) was a leading Irish businessman and philanthropist. FitzGerald was born in Limerick, Ireland to a southern Irish Protestant family. His father, Gerald FitzGerald, was a bank manager. He attended Wesley College, a prestigious Dublin school run by his maternal uncle Gerald Myles. Upon graduating he joined a host of notable alumni such as playwright George Bernard Shaw and Chaim Herzog, the sixth President of Israel.

In the late 1950s, FitzGerald emerged as a pioneer of scuba diving in Ireland. FitzGerald's work in the fledgling field of underwater photography unveiled and displayed the marine life of the Irish coastline to a wondrous audience. At a time when the Irish authorities had no diving capability, FitzGerald was often summoned to lead dives on behalf of the government.

FitzGerald began his business career as a trainee in a small accounting firm. Following a series of mergers, FitzGerald quickly rose through the ranks and was ultimately appointed the head partner of PricewaterhouseCoopers. In the 1980s, as the Irish economy was experiencing a crippling recession, FitzGerald emerged as a leading insolvency practitioner. His business reputation flourished after a string of successes in rescuing failing businesses. In 1986, FitzGerald was the defendant in a landmark legal case brought by Irish tobacco giant Carroll Group. The court issued judgement in favor of FitzGerald. The precedent set by Carroll Group v Bourke defines the legal treatment of "reservation of title". In recognition of his distinguished business career, FitzGerald was featured in Maureen Cairnduff's "Who's Who in Ireland: The Influential 1000".

Upon retirement, FitzGerald devoted much of his time to philanthropic activities. He was instrumental in introducing Ireland to the concept of assisted living communities for the elderly. With the help of his wife, Valerie, and friend Reverend Desmond Bain, the President of the Methodist Church in Ireland, FitzGerald founded and developed the first assisted living community in Adare, Ireland, in 1994.

Dermot FitzGerald died of cancer in 2006 in his native Limerick, Ireland.

References

Fitzgerald
Fitzgerald
Fitzgerald
Fitzgerald
Businesspeople from County Limerick
Fitzgerald
People educated at Wesley College, Dublin